Kharagpur Homoeopathic Medical College and Hospital, is a homeopathic medical college in Kharagpur, Paschim Medinipur district,  West Bengal, India. The college is recognized by the Central Council of Homeopathy, New Delhi. This college is affiliated to the West Bengal University of Health Sciences. It offers the Bachelor of Homeopathic Medicine and Surgery (BHMS) degree course.

See also

References

External links
 

Homeopathic hospitals
Hospitals in West Bengal
Universities and colleges in Paschim Medinipur district
Homoeopathic Medical Colleges in West Bengal
Affiliates of West Bengal University of Health Sciences
Educational institutions established in 1971
1971 establishments in West Bengal